Weather satellite pictures are often broadcast as high-resolution picture transmissions (HRPTs), color high-resolution picture transmissions (CHRPTs) for Chinese weather satellite transmissions, or advanced high-resolution picture transmissions (AHRPTs) for EUMETSAT weather satellite transmissions. HRPT transmissions are available around the world and are available from both polar and geostationary weather satellites. The polar satellites rotate in orbits that allow each location on earth to be covered by the weather satellite twice per day while the geostationary satellites remain in one location at the equator taking weather images of the earth from that location over the equator. The sensor on weather satellites that picks up the data transmitted in HRPT is referred to as an Advanced Very High Resolution Radiometer (AVHRR).

Broadcast signal
The working frequency band for HRPT is L Band at 1.670–1.710 GHz and the modulation 
types are BPSK and QPSK. On NOAA KLM satellites the transmission power is 6.35 Watts, or 38.03 dBm. The METOP-A satellite broadcasts with a bandwidth of 4.5 MHz.

Reception

Hardware 
In order to receive HRPT transmissions a high gain antenna is required, such as a small satellite dish, a helical antenna, or a crossed yagi. Basic reception equipment includes a parabolic dish antenna attached to an Azimuth-Elevation unit. The HRPT signal is further enhanced with a 1.7 GHz pre-amplifier. An HRPT receiver unit and a dish tracking controller are required to steer the Azimuth-Elevation unit controlling the parabolic dish.  As an alternative to receiving direct broadcast from polar orbiting satellites, users in Europe and Africa can also receive rebroadcast data from the EUMETSAT EUMETCAST service via Digital Video Broadcasting using a simple stationary satellite dish.

Software 
Both commercial and free software for demodulating HRPT transmission signals exists: Example of commercial demodulation software is XHRPT Decoder. Free software exists as a part of GNURadio package, the GR-NOAA blocks and flowcharts distributed by Manuel Bülo.

Free software for decoding data packets contained in HRPT is available, for example DWDSAT HRPT Viewer V1.1.0 or AAPP with Satpy.

Satellite status

Notes and references 

Satellite broadcasting
Weather satellites